The AV was a British cyclecar manufactured by Ward and Avey in Somerset Road, Teddington Middlesex between 1919 and 1924.

It was one of the more successful cyclecars and was based on a design bought from Carden and built in the factory that they had previously used. At the peak they had 80 employees.

Engines were rear mounted, air-cooled and rated from 5 to 8hp. There was a choice of JAP (most commonly), Blackburne or rarely MAG units. Gearboxes were either a two-speed epicyclic unit with foot-operated change or three-speed Sturmey-Archer with chain drive to the rear axle. Steering was by a wire and bobbin system with the entire front axle being pivoted on early cars. Several hundred were made.

The Monocar was described by Ixion of The Motor Cycle as "a low, coffin-shape projectile, moderately attractive in dense fog.

In 1920 a two-seater, the Bi-car, was added with the passenger behind the driver. The width of the car increased to 36 inches. About 50 were made. The original Monocar and Bi-car were dropped in 1922 but production of the Runabout continued until 1924 and later to special order.

The company changed its name in 1923 to A.V. Motors Ltd and after the end of car production became Jowett and later Rootes Group dealers.

See also
 List of car manufacturers of the United Kingdom

References

External links
 1919 AV Monocar advertisement

Vintage vehicles
Cyclecars
Defunct motor vehicle manufacturers of England
Vehicle manufacture in London
Vehicle manufacturing companies established in 1919